In topology, the Tietze extension theorem (also known as the Tietze–Urysohn–Brouwer extension theorem) states that continuous functions on a closed subset of a normal topological space can be extended to the entire space, preserving boundedness if necessary.

Formal statement
If  is a normal space and

that is, if  is bounded then  may be chosen to be bounded (with the same bound as ).

History
L. E. J. Brouwer and Henri Lebesgue proved a special case of the theorem, when  is a finite-dimensional real vector space. Heinrich Tietze extended it to all metric spaces, and Pavel Urysohn proved the theorem as stated here, for normal topological spaces.

Equivalent statements
This theorem is equivalent to Urysohn's lemma (which is also equivalent to the normality of the space) and is widely applicable, since all metric spaces and all compact Hausdorff spaces are normal.

Variations
This theorem is also valid for Hölder continuous functions, that is, if  is Hölder continuous function with constant less than or equal to  then  can be extended to a Hölder continuous function  with the same constant.

Another variant (in fact, generalization) of Tietze's theorem is due to H.Tong and  Z. Ercan:
extension  of  such that  for each  
This theorem is also valid with some additional hypothesis if  is replaced by a general locally solid Riesz space.

See also

References

External links
 Weisstein, Eric W.  "Tietze's Extension Theorem." From MathWorld
 Mizar system proof: http://mizar.org/version/current/html/tietze.html#T23
 .

Theory of continuous functions
Theorems in topology